Hycleus balteata, is a species of blister beetle found in India, and Sri Lanka.

Description
Body length is about 8 to 17 mm. Head is 1.2 to 2.6 mm long with coarse moderate deep and dense punctures. Head with very prominent tempora. Eyes narrow and reniform. Maxillary palpi with cylindrical apical pigment and covered very short pubescence. Elytra broadened from base. There is a basal yellow band with a small black dot on elytra. Male has moderately deeply emarginate sixth visible abdominal sternum, whereas female has feebly emarginate sixth visible abdominal sternum.

References 

Meloidae
Insects of Sri Lanka
Insects of India
Insects described in 1782